"Smack My Bitch Up" is a song by English rave group The Prodigy. It was released in November 1997 as the third and final single from their third album, The Fat of the Land (1997). In 2013, Mixmag readers voted it the third greatest dance track of all time.

The song caused considerable controversy because of its suggestive title and explicit music video, which depicted scenes of drunken and drug-fuelled sexual assault and violence. The refrain, which consists only of the line "Change my pitch up/Smack my bitch up" was sampled from the song "Give the Drummer Some" by the Ultramagnetic MCs, and it also contains a brief medley of an unidentified female singer vocalising alap. In 2010, the song was voted as the most controversial of all-time in a survey conducted by PRS for Music.

Prior to the release of the single, Liam Howlett was presented with three remixes of the title song, one by Jonny L, one by DJ Hype and one by Slacker. Howlett chose the DJ Hype remix to be released on the single. The Jonny L remix was released through a free CD that came along with an issue of Muzik magazine, while the Slacker remix was never officially released, although it surfaced on a rare and limited set of white labels.

Composition
The lyrics "Change my pitch up / Smack my bitch up" are repeated through the whole song. The vocals are sampled and altered from the Ultramagnetic MCs song "Give the Drummer Some"; the original lyrics, performed by rapper Kool Keith, are:  "Switch up change my pitch up" / "Smack my bitch up, like a pimp". Kool Keith had previously been sampled by the Prodigy in the track "Out of Space". The female vocals in "Smack My Bitch Up" were performed by Shahin Badar. Badar's vocals and harmonies are based on "Nana (The Dreaming)" performed by Sheila Chandra. Initially Liam Howlett used a direct sample of Chandra's song, but later had the vocal resung after sample clearance issues. The track also contains samples from "Funky Man" by Kool & the Gang, "In Memory Of" by Randy Weston, "Bulls on Parade" by Rage Against the Machine and "House of Rising Funk" by Afrique.

Critical reception
British magazine Music Week gave "Smack My Bitch Up" five out of five, picking it as Single of the Week.

Chart performance
The song reached the top 15 in several countries, such as Canada, New Zealand, Norway and Sweden. The song performed best in Finland, securing the Prodigy their third Finnish No. 1 hit alongside "Firestarter" and "Breathe". Although not reaching the top 20 in those countries, "Smack My Bitch Up" was a hit in the Netherlands peaking at No. 22, in Australia reaching No. 41, and in the United States reaching No. 89. The single also returned to the Billboard charts after Flint's death, entering number 23 on its Dance/Electronic Digital Songs Sales chart in its 16 March 2019 issue.

Music video
Director Jonas Åkerlund's music video for "Smack My Bitch Up" was rarely seen on television due to its controversial subject matter. The video, filmed entirely in first-person perspective, depicts a drug-and-alcohol-fueled night out through the eyes of a mostly-unseen character, and utilises different camera movements, through a 35 mm film camera attached to director of photography Henrik Halvarson's head, corresponding with the protagonist's altered state of mind. This character first showers and dresses, then drinks vodka and sniffs cocaine before going out. At a bar, the protagonist has several more drinks, sexually assaults multiple women, violently attacks several men, and destroys the DJ's equipment before running to the toilets to vomit and inject intravenous drugs, resulting in a shaky and disorientated vision. Later, at a strip club, the protagonist drinks more alcohol while watching nude dancers, and eventually brings one stripper home to have sex. Finally, after they have sex, a look in the mirror reveals the protagonist to have been a young, blonde woman; as the song ends, she passes out on her bed.

Liam Howlett noted: 
There's a realness to that video. Most people have had nights out like that, off their head on coke and drink … It's not to everyone's taste, but not everything we do is. No radio station was gonna play the song, so we thought we'd make a video that no one would play either.

Controversy

Lyrical controversy

The song's lyrics, often held as misogynistic, were defended by the band, saying that the lyrics were being misinterpreted and the song actually meant "...doing anything intensely..."

"Smack My Bitch Up" was banned by the BBC and only a lyric-free version was played on BBC Radio 1. On the chart rundown, other tracks from the single release were played, and the title "Smack My Bitch Up" was not mentioned. On the BBC World Service radio chart run down it was mentioned as "Smack" and was not played. Yet on the first episode of Top of the Pops in which it charted, the DJ Hype remix was played over the top 10 countdown, including the offending lyric of "Change my pitch up, smack my bitch up." On his 25 April 2009 Radio 1 Essential Mix, producer Sub Focus included his own drum and bass remix of "Smack My Bitch Up" which also included this lyric, though a warning preceded the track.

ITV Chart Show refused to display the name of the song when the video was played during one of their episodes. Usually aired at 11.30 a.m., the show displayed the on-screen graphic as simply "The Prodigy"; the title of the song would usually appear underneath. This also meant they avoided playing a part of the song that used the offending lyric when playing the customary music video clip.

It received daytime airplay on London indie station XFM and reached No. 1 in their Top 30 chart.

In 2016, a DJ for the Chicago Cubs played the song as pitcher Aroldis Chapman left the mound. Chapman had served a 29-game suspension under Major League Baseball's domestic violence policy. The Cubs apologised for the music choice and announced that they had fired the DJ.

Video

MTV initially restricted the video to late-night rotation, starting with a midnight debut on 120 Minutes on 7 December 1997. The video garnered controversy for depiction of driving under the influence, drug use, violence (including street fighting and a hit-and-run incident), vandalism, nudity and sex, and also drew criticism for misogyny, particularly from feminist groups such as the US National Organization for Women (NOW), accusing it of encouraging violence against women. On 22 December, MTV removed the video from rotation; a statement was posted on the network's official website the same day, which stated that protests from feminist organisations had nothing to do with the decision. Despite the controversy, the video was nominated for four awards in the 1998 MTV Video Music Awards, and eventually won Best Dance Video and Breakthrough Video. In 2002, MTV2 played the full unedited version as part of its special Most Controversial Videos.

The track Mindfields (Headrock Dub) has sometimes been mistakenly identified as "Abadosa dub" because of the graffiti lettering on the single's track list.

Track listing

XL Recordings
 12-inch vinyl record
"Smack My Bitch Up"  – 5:42
"No Man Army"  – 4:44
"Smack My Bitch Up"  – 7:17
"Mindfields"  – 4:34

 CD single
"Smack My Bitch Up"  – 4:45
"No Man Army" – 4:44
"Mindfields"  – 4:34
"Smack My Bitch Up"  – 7:17

Maverick Records
 12-inch vinyl record "Black sleeve"
A1. "Smack My Bitch Up"  – 5:43
A2. "Mindfields"  – 4:35
B1. "Smack My Bitch Up"  – 7:17

 12-inch vinyl record
A1. "Smack My Bitch Up"  – 5:42
A2. "No Man Army"  – 4:44
B1. "Mindfields"  – 4:34
B2. "Smack My Bitch Up"  – 7:17

 Digipak
"Smack My Bitch Up"  – 4:45
"No Man Army"  – 4:44
"Mindfields"  – 4:34
"Smack My Bitch Up"  – 7:17

* The digipak was released in cooperation with Sire.

Charts

Certifications

In other media
Smack My Bitch Up was in the soundtrack of the 2000 version of Charlie’s Angels. In 2001, the song was featured in the comedy horror film Scary Movie 2.

In 2012, a parody video, by the now defunct YouTube channel TheCube95, went viral. The video featured a cat exhibiting similar reckless behavior to that of the woman in the original music video.

In 2020, the game Cyberpunk 2077 featured a scene where the main character, V, in the "Chipin' In" main quest, goes to clubs, gets tattoos, does drugs and drinks alcohol while being controlled by the character of Johnny Silverhand. The cutscene is in first-person perspective (just like most of the game) and has a corresponding song on the soundtrack titled "Smack My Chip Up", a clear reference to "Smack My Bitch Up". Released the same year, Assassin's Creed Valhalla includes a sidequest called "The Prodigy", where the player character boxes a clergyman, prompting a character named Keith to sing, "Smack my bishop!"

References

The Prodigy songs
1997 songs
1997 singles
XL Recordings singles
Music videos directed by Jonas Åkerlund
Number-one singles in Finland
Number-one singles in Spain
Songs written by Liam Howlett
Obscenity controversies in music
1997 controversies
Maverick Records singles
Music video controversies
Songs banned by the BBC